Angry Kid is a British live-action/stop-motion adult animated comedy web series created, directed, written, and designed by Darren Walsh (who also provides the voice of the title character) and produced by Aardman Animations for Series 1 and 2 and by Mr Morris Productions for Series 3 and 4.

Unlike most Aardman productions, Angry Kid was not created using clay animation but a combination of pixilation (using actors in a form of stop motion puppetry) with masks for facial expressions. Series 3 onwards uses CGI for Angry Kid's head, along with live action. The series also aired in the United States on MTV.

Series 1 and 2 have been released on DVD in the UK by 20th Century Fox Home Entertainment and Pathé and in Australia. All the Angry Kid animations from before the third series were on Atom.com before the site was absorbed into Comedy Central. A compilation DVD called Aardman's Dark Side was also released, and it contains several Series 2 episodes and an exclusive episode. The vast majority of Angry Kid has since been released on YouTube.

After an 8-year hiatus, Series 3 was launched on 3 July 2015 with the episode 'Interview'. Series 4 launched 4 years later in September 2019.

Unlike the first two series, Series 3 and 4 were exclusively released on the official Angry Kid YouTube page, with new episodes appearing every three weeks.

The fourth series concluded on 27 December 2019, and, as of December 2022, no further posts have been made to the Angry Kid page.

Cast

 Darren Walsh as Angry Kid, the title protagonist and antihero. He is a redheaded boy of secondary school age who has a foul mouth and a terrible attitude. He is a mean-spirited brat who gains great enjoyment out of irritating and enraging others. He does not care who he steps on or what trouble he causes as long as it gets him what he needs or wants. Angry Kid is almost always seen wearing a dark blue parka jacket with a furry hood (even over his pyjamas). He is known by police officers as "the little ginger git on the bike" and he is also known as "Stanners." Angry Kid lives with his parents and his younger sister in the TV series but in the special episode "Who Do I Think I Am?", his mother abandons them. He also has a pet dog. Angry Kid also regularly falls victim to dog attacks, as he is seen being attacked by a dog multiple times throughout the series.
 David Holt as Dad, Angry Kid's unseen father. He has an obsession for country and western music which he often plays in the car. He usually hits Angry Kid with his newspaper when Angry Kid says or does something stupid or annoying (but only his hand is shown when he hits him). In Who Do You Think You Are?, when he shows Angry Kid some home videos, his full body (apart from his face) is shown. He also plays the Teacher, who only appears in the setting of Angry Kid and Speccy's classroom. According to Who Do I Think I Am, the teacher is a male who happens to have a feminine-sounding voice, much to Angry Kid's confusion So far, he has only been in two episodes, both of which are specials: Darkside and Who do I Think I Am?
 Jo Allen / Beth Chalmers as Lil' Sis, Angry Kid's younger sister. Her brother usually torments and teases her, but she gets her own back sometimes. Even though she is smaller and younger than Angry Kid, she is a lot smarter. She very rarely speaks, but she has a speaking part in the episode "Horror," in which she was possessed by an evil spirit and her head turned all the way around. She also talks in the Who Do I Think I Am? specials, the Aardman's Dark Side exclusive episode and in Series 4.
 Mike Cooper / Kevin Eldon / Lee Evans as Speccy, Angry Kid's nerdy "best friend". Speccy is allergic to nuts (as revealed in "Swollen"), and when Angry Kid shoved a handful down his throat, he became severely disfigured, and he was then rushed to hospital by Dad. Speccy is always picked on by Angry Kid, who is cruel to him (e.g. making Speccy do his homework for him or not letting him watch movies with him). In Who Do I Think I Am?, it is revealed that Speccy's real name is Myles.

Episodes

Production
Series 1 and 2 were produced by Aardman Animations. Series 3 and 4 were distributed by Aardman Animations and produced by Mr Morris Productions.

Series 1
 Car Sick
 Sex Education
 Goalie
 Blood Juice
 Speed
 Chips
 Headlights
 Cotton Bud
 Bored
 Bone
 Captain Thunderpants
 Stinky
 Queen's Speech
 Hard Face
 Swearing
 Superhero
 Love Bite
 Buzz Off
 Backwards Writing
 Hoax Call
 Wee Wee
 Road Hog
 Sneeze
 Horror 
 Kidnap

Series 2
 Cake
 Tourette's
 Dustbin
 Sex Call
 Strange Trip 
 Curious
 I Spy
 Swollen
 Catapult
 Russian Roulette
 Dolly
 Card Trick
 Puerile
 Bad News
 Piss
 Wanker
 Chemistry
 Philosophical
 Sofa Attack 
 Snail
 Jackanory
 Marathon Man
 Road Safety
 Birdy
 What Are You Like?

Series 3
 Fish Factzz
 Boyhood
 Interview
 Workout
 Stephen
 Mind Control
 Bumfluff
 Puberty
 Emo
 Vaccination
 How To: Make a Donald Trump Xmas Decoration 
Series 4
 Callout
 Lil' Sis
 Perfect Body
 Mars
 Offstep
 Careers Advice
 Politics
 Fartburger
 Sponsored Silence

Specials

Who Do I Think I Am?
A 23-minute special, broadcast on BBC Three at 7:30 pm on Christmas Eve, 2004. The plot focuses on Angry Kid, who is given the task to write a 10-page essay for his teacher on who he really thinks he is. Despite their efforts, his dad and his friend Speccy are of no help, and neither is a website he finds online, but later he gets the aid of Lil' Sis, who wants all of his possessions in return for writing the essay, to which he reluctantly agrees. The special ends with Angry Kid reading out the essay written by his sister about who he really is before being punished by having an intense workout session in the school gymnasium under the supervision of an evil gym teacher.

Handbags
Angry Kid raps, with the Flaming Choppers, in a music video called "Handbags," telling the story of how the kids (which, oddly, look exactly like him) playing football also use handbags. The song was released as a single on 29 May 2006 by Musicalities Ltd.

Single track listing

Gridlock
Angry Kid and the other characters sing in a music video called "Gridlock," telling the story of how the kids were stuck in a traffic jam and everyone was fighting with each other. It was part of Aardman's Live Earth series.

Angry Kid's Dark Side
A straight-to-DVD episode featured on Aardman's Dark Side DVD. Angry Kid is running in the forest, where he finds a bandaged-up version of himself as a girl. Angry Kid soon realizes that it is just a nightmare, and the imagery used here is also a reference to a scene from the 1981 horror cult classic film: An American Werewolf in London. Lil' Sis comes into his bedroom to ask if he is all right, and asks if he can play with her, but then she splits in two before him, which turns out to be yet another nightmare in reference to The Shining. He wakes up again to find Speccy is at the foot of his bed, talking about maths and triangles. Angry Kid calls his nightmare nonsense, and Speccy dryly retorts that the real nightmare is when he wakes up. Angry Kid then realises that he is at school wearing a dress. Angry Kid is promptly told off by his teacher before Speccy keeps saying, "There's no place like home" 3 times (a reference to The Wizard of Oz). Angry Kid then hits Speccy with a shoe, and the nightmares end.

Merry Christmas Stocking Song
Angry Kid sings an acoustic Christmas song called Merry Christmas Stocking Song. The video comes to Angry Kid is celebrating the side of a Christmas tree with an average of Santa Claus and he wanted to know what you got for Christmas. And he was given a leg. The video was recorded in 2004 and can be seen on YouTube. At the end of the video says: Happy Christmas from Angry Kid.

My Vloggy
A three part special released over December 2015. In My Exclusive Movie Review No.1, Angry Kid reviews what he claims is the new Star Wars film. In How To: Make a Donald Trump Xmas Decoration, Angry Kid shows how to make the figure out of a potato and shredded wheat. In My Christmas Vloggy, Angry Kid shows the presents he received including Marmite toothpaste and dog excrement in a box.

Call Out!
Angry Kid asks the audience if there is something they would like him to comment on.

See also
 Rex the Runt - The Aardman Adult show starring Richard Goleszowski.

References

External links
 

1990s British adult animated television series
1998 British television series debuts
1990s animated short films
2000s animated short films
British adult animated comedy television series
Clay animation television series
Aardman Animations
Stop motion characters
Fictional English people
Television series by Aardman Animations
Television characters introduced in 1998
Adult animated web series
1998 web series debuts
Web series featuring puppetry
British comedy web series
British animated web series
2019 American television series endings
Channel 4 original programming